This is a List of Formula Regional European Championship drivers, that is, a list of drivers who have made at least one race start in the Formula Regional European Championship, which was established in 2019. 

This list is accurate up to and including the Imola round of the 2021 Formula Regional European Championship.

By name

By racing license

Footnotes

References

 
Formula Regional European Championship drivers